Geranopterus is an extinct genus of Geranopteridae that lived during the late Eocene to early Miocene in Europe. It was named by Milne-Edwards in 1892.

References

 The Origin and Evolution of Birds by Alan Feduccia

Coraciiformes
Eocene birds
Oligocene birds
Miocene birds
Eocene birds of Europe
Prehistoric bird genera